The 1944 Limerick Senior Hurling Championship was the 50th staging of the Limerick Senior Hurling Championship since its establishment by the Limerick County Board.

Ahane were the defending champions.

On 10 September 1944, Ahane won the championship after a 4-02 to 1-08 defeat of Rathkeale in the final. It was their 11th championship title overall and their third title in succession.

Results

Final

References

Limerick Senior Hurling Championship
Limerick Senior Hurling Championship